The historic Wadsworth Theatre is a live theatre in the Sawtelle community of West Los Angeles, in Los Angeles, California. 

It is located on the historic Sawtelle Veterans Home campus, the present day  West Los Angeles Department of Veterans Affairs complex. It is off Wilshire Boulevard and San Vicente Boulevard, on the east side of Brentwood.

History
The theater was built in 1939 in the Spanish Colonial Revival style. It underwent an extensive restoration in 2002. 

The Wadsworth Theater is used to present various Broadway shows, musical concerts, film premieres, and live theatrical productions. It has also hosted the annual Streamy Awards, since they were first held there in 2009.

See also

References

Theatres in Los Angeles
Sawtelle, Los Angeles
West Los Angeles
Wilshire Boulevard
Event venues established in 1939
1939 establishments in California
1930s architecture in the United States
Spanish Colonial Revival architecture in California